Werner Romberg (born 16 May 1909 in Berlin; died 5 February 2003 in Heidelberg) was a German mathematician and physicist.

Romberg studied mathematics and physics form 1928 in Heidelberg and Munich and completed his doctorate in 1933 at Munich University under the supervision of Arnold Sommerfeld;  his thesis was entitled "Zur Polarisation des Kanalstrahllichtes" ["On the polarisation of channel light beams"].  In Munich he studied mathematics under, among others, Oskar Perron and Constantin Carathéodory.  In 1933, as a so-called "half-Jew" in the terminology of the new National Socialist government of Germany, he sought to emigrate to the Soviet Union.  From 1934 to 1937 he worked as a theoretical physicist in the University of Dnipro (then Dnipropetrovsk).  In 1938 he went, via the Institute for Astrophysics in Prague, to Norway, where he became an assistant to Egil Hylleraas at the University of Oslo.  He also briefly worked at the Technical University of Trondheim with Johan Holtsmark, who was building a Van de Graaff generator there.  With the German occupation of Norway he fled to Uppsala in Sweden.  In 1941 the Nazi German state stripped him of his German citizenship, and in 1943 recognition of his doctorate was revoked. He became a Norwegian citizen in 1947.

After the Second World War, from 1949 to 1968, he was a Professor in Trondheim;  from 1960 he was head of the applied mathematics department.  In Norway he built up his research group in numerical analysis, and part of the introduction of digital computers, such as GIER, the first computer at Trondheim.  From 1968 he held the Chair for Mathematical Methods in Natural Sciences and Numerics at Heidelberg University.

See also 

 Romberg's method

References 

 Stefanie Harrecker: Degradierte Doktoren  : die Aberkennung der Doktorwürde an der Ludwig-Maximilians-Universität München während der Zeit des Nationalsozialismus, München  : Utz, 2007 . Kurzbio S. 346
Claude Brezinski, Some pioneers of extrapolation methods, in Adhemar Bultheel, Ronald Cools (Hrsg.), The birth of numerical analysis, World Scientific 2010, S. 10 (Biographie)

External links 
Obituary at the University of Heidelberg

20th-century German physicists
20th-century German mathematicians
Numerical analysts
Jewish emigrants from Nazi Germany to Norway
1909 births
2003 deaths
Academic staff of Heidelberg University
Academic staff of the Norwegian Institute of Technology